Janus Renato Robles Mateo III (born 19 November 1984), better known by his screen name Janus del Prado, is a Filipino actor. He is a former talent of Star Magic.

Early life
He is the youngest son of veteran action star Renato del Prado and actress Amelia Robles.

Career
He started in showbusiness at age of 5 doing bit roles. His mother refused to use his father's influence in the industry to get in so she trained him herself and his other two siblings to act and regularly brings them to auditions. He has been in the industry since 1990 and has done a variety of roles. Despite the popular belief that he was a member of 1992 variety/gag show Ang TV, he was not. He auditioned a bunch of times but never got cast. Some of his movies are Pulis Probinsya, Pulis Probinsya 2, Magic Kingdom: Ang Alamat ng Damortis, One More Chance, Catch Me, I'm in Love, Pagpag: Siyam na Buhay, A Second Chance, How to Be Yours, and TV shows are G-mik, Qpids, Lobo, Batang X, Green Rose, Bridges of Love, The Story of Us, Ang Bagong Pamilya ni Ponching, to name a few.

Following the closure of ABS-CBN Channel 2 on May 5, 2020, Janus returned to GMA Channel 7 for his comeback kapuso project after his last GMA 7 show was a youth oriented drama series Hanggang Kailan in 2004, and also his 1st sitcom entitled Happy Together with fellow matinee idol and actor John Lloyd Cruz, former Goin Bulilit actors Miles Ocampo & Vito Quizon, former Dick & Carmi Host Carmi Martin, former PBB Housemate Jayson Gainza, former Your Face Sounds Familiar Philippines Contestant Eric Nicholas, model & comedian Ashley Rivera, actress Jenzel Angeles, former Kalokalike Contestant Wally Waley, and former Banana Split cast member comedian host Kuya Jobert Austria.

Filmography

Television

Film

Awards and nominations

References

 Fionna Acaba, "Janus Del Prado enjoys doing supporting roles", 
 Pilar Mateo,"Janus del Prado moves on after hurtful break-up with Carla Humphries",
 

1984 births
Living people
ABS-CBN personalities
Star Magic
GMA Network personalities
Filipino male child actors
Filipino male comedians
Filipino male film actors
Filipino male television actors
Participants in Philippine reality television series
Male actors from Manila
20th-century Filipino male actors
21st-century Filipino male actors